Sone Ka Dil Lohe Ke Haath is a 1978 Bollywood action film directed by Naresh Kumar.

Kumar stars in a physically demanding and tension-filled role.

The film did "average box office."

Cast  
Rajendra Kumar as Shankar
Vidya Sinha as Parvati
Mala Sinha as Mother  
Dara Singh as Nihalchand
Nazir Hussain as Balkishan 
Aruna Irani as Dancer 
Kamal Kapoor as Dinanath Mathur 
Viju Khote as Birju 
Ram Mohan as Ramu Ustad 
Jagdish Raj as Police Inspector

Music
All songs were penned by Asad Bhopali

References

External links
 

1978 films
1970s Hindi-language films
1978 action films
Films scored by Usha Khanna